Oren F. and Adelia Parker House is a historic home located at Rensselaer, Jasper County, Indiana.  It was built between 1915 and 1917, and is a two-story, Bungalow / American Craftsman style brick dwelling with some Tudor Revival style design elements.  The roof is sheathed in green tile and it features a large porte cochere and enclosed porch.  The interior features original woodwork, fixtures, and murals.

It was listed on the National Register of Historic Places in 2014.

References

Houses on the National Register of Historic Places in Indiana
Tudor Revival architecture in Indiana
Houses completed in 1917
Buildings and structures in Jasper County, Indiana
National Register of Historic Places in Jasper County, Indiana
1917 establishments in Indiana